Roses (Rosa species) are used as food plants by the caterpillars (larvae) of a number of Lepidoptera species, including:

Monophagous
Species that feed exclusively on Rosa

 Coleophoridae
 Several Coleophora case-bearer species:
 C. gryphipennella
 C. rosacella
 C. rosaefoliella

Polyphagous
Species that feed on Rosa and other plants

 Arctiidae
 Hypercompe indecisa
 Coleophoridae
 Several Coleophora case-bearer species:
 C. paripennella
 C. potentillae
 Geometridae
 Common emerald (Hemithea aestivaria)
 Common marbled carpet (Chloroclysta truncata)
 Double-striped pug (Gymnoscelis rufifasciata)
 Engrailed (Ectropis crepuscularia)
 Mottled umber (Erannis defoliaria)
 Purple thorn (Selenia tetralunaria)
 Scalloped oak (Crocallis elinguaria)
 Winter moth (Operophtera brumata)
 Hepialidae
 Endoclita malabaricus
 Hesperiidae
 Grizzled skipper (Pyrgus malvae)
 Lymantriidae
 Brown-tail (Euproctis chrysorrhoea)
 Noctuidae
 Copper underwing (Amphipyra pyramidea)
 Dark dagger (Acronicta tridens)
 Grey dagger (Acronicta psi)
 Mouse moth (Amphipyra tragopoginis)
 Notodontidae
 Buff-tip (Phalera bucephala)
 Coxcomb prominent (Ptilodon capucina)
 Rough prominent (Nadata gibbosa)
 Saturniidae
 Emperor moth (Pavonia pavonia)

External links

Roses
Roses